Maximilian Delphinius Berlitz (or Maximilien Berlitz, born David Berlizheimer; April 14, 1852 – April 6, 1921) was a linguist and the founder of the Berlitz Language Schools, the first of which he established in 1878 in Providence, Rhode Island.

Life and career
Born David Berlizheimer to Jewish parents in Mühringen, Kingdom of Württemberg, Germany, he and his sister were soon orphaned, and he grew up in a family of educators in the Black Forest. Berlitz was required by law to serve as an apprentice; he chose to work for a watchmaker for three years. He later relocated to France and then to Providence, Rhode Island, United States in 1872.  His first employment was as a teacher of French and German at Warner Polytechnic College, of which he assumed control in 1878 when the owner of the school, Mr. Warner, disappeared with all the prepaid tuition money. When Berlitz became ill, and was unable to teach a French class, he quickly hired Nicholas Joly to replace him and teach the class. Since he had always corresponded with Joly in French, he did not realize that Joly did not speak any English until after he had hired him. Joly taught the class entirely in French (with no translation) by using gestures, pointing to objects and using tone of voice and facial expressions to convey meaning. Berlitz returned to the class six weeks later to find that his students, who had spoken little to no French before Joly began teaching, were conversing semi-fluently in French. Their pronunciation and grammar were also very good. Berlitz used this experience to develop the Berlitz Method, for which only the language to be taught is spoken from the first day of class. Students rely on the same techniques Joly used, rather than translation, to gather meaning and learn grammar and vocabulary.

After success, Berlitz opened a second language school in Boston in 1880, supplemented by others in New York and Washington, D.C. He went on to establish schools all over the U.S. and in many countries abroad. Between 1880 and 1900 he also began writing about his ideas, developing them into a systematic method, which he then presented in 1900 at the World's Fair in Paris. As the twentieth century opened, he began travelling extensively, making headlines by teaching German Emperor Kaiser Wilhelm II to speak English. Berlitz's fame continued to spread as he received medals of honor from the King of Spain, the government of France, and from many international expositions. He remained active until his death, aged 68, in New York City. He is buried in Woodlawn Cemetery in Bronx, New York.

Mr. Berlitz's method of language learning is still used.  Many books that were originally published during the early- to mid-1900s are still in print.  There are also many schools that are still dedicated to continuing Berlitz's concepts regarding language learning.

The linguist and author Charles Berlitz, his grandson, was for a time the CEO of Berlitz International.

See also 
 Berlitz International

References

External links
 

1852 births
1921 deaths
American educators
American people of German-Jewish descent
Language teachers
19th-century German Jews
German emigrants to the United States
Burials at Woodlawn Cemetery (Bronx, New York)